Bioconjugate Chemistry is a monthly peer-reviewed scientific journal covering research in bioconjugation and the interface between man-made and biological materials. The journal was established in 1990 and is published by the American Chemical Society. It is abstracted and indexed in Chemical Abstracts Service, Scopus, EBSCO databases, ProQuest databases, Index Medicus/MEDLINE/PubMed, and the Science Citation Index Expanded.

The current editor-in-chief is Vincent M. Rotello, succeeding Claude F. Meares.

According to the Journal Citation Reports, the journal has a 2021 impact factor of 6.069.

References

External links

American Chemical Society academic journals
Publications established in 1990
Monthly journals
English-language journals
Biochemistry journals